This is a list of properties and historic districts in Montana that are listed on the National Register of Historic Places. The state's more than 1,100 listings are distributed across all of its 56 counties.

The locations of National Register properties and districts (at least for all showing latitude and longitude coordinates below), may be seen in an online map by clicking on "Map of all coordinates".

Current listings by county
The following are approximate tallies of current listings by county.

Beaverhead County

Big Horn County

Blaine County

Broadwater County

|}

Carbon County

Carter County

|}

Cascade County

Chouteau County

Custer County

Daniels County

|}

Dawson County

Deer Lodge County

Fallon County

|}

Fergus County

Flathead County

Gallatin County

Garfield County

|}

Glacier County

Golden Valley County

|}

Granite County

Hill County

|}

Jefferson County

Judith Basin County

|}

Lake County

Lewis and Clark County

Liberty County

|}

Lincoln County

|}

Madison County

McCone County

|}

Meagher County

|}

Mineral County

Missoula County

Musselshell County

|}

Park County

Petroleum County

|}

Phillips County

|}

Pondera County

|}

Powder River County

|}

Powell County

Prairie County

|}

Ravalli County

Richland County

|}

Roosevelt County

|}

Rosebud County

Sanders County

Sheridan County

|}

Silver Bow County

Stillwater County

Sweet Grass County

|}

Teton County

|}

Toole County

|}

Treasure County

|}

Valley County

Wheatland County

|}

Former listings

|}

Wibaux County

|}

Yellowstone County

See also
List of National Historic Landmarks in Montana

References

External links

Montana History Wiki section on National Register of Historic Places sign texts.

Montana